Lera Loeb is a Ukrainian-born writer, producer, actress and film maker, most notable for directing and producing high-end fashion films, short format narrative and digital branded content.

Life

Early life 
Born Valeriya Sorokina in Dnipropetrovsk, Ukraine, to a family of doctors.

Move to the United States 
In 2000, she received a cultural exchange scholarship to study in New York City. While living with an American host family, she decided to permanently move to the United States.  She eventually met American music producer Steve Loeb.

New York City and later life 
She  earned her bachelor's degree at City University of New York.

Lera became a successful writer, and was described by The Sunday Telegraph as "a thriving publicist" in the fashion industry. As of 2009, her blog had been recognized by Elle.

References

External links
Lera Loeb Films
Lera Loeb Instagram
 IMDB
/ Faddy Magazine Staff Cinematographer

Fashion journalists
Living people
Ukrainian women journalists
Ukrainian emigrants to the United States
Year of birth missing (living people)
People from Dnipro